Mandy Minella (born 22 November 1985) is a former professional tennis player from Luxembourg. Having made her debut on the WTA Tour in 2001, she peaked at No. 66 in the WTA singles rankings in September 2012, and No. 47 in doubles in April 2013.

Minella won two doubles tournaments on the WTA Tour, as well as one singles title and three doubles events of WTA 125 tournaments. She also won 16 singles and ten doubles titles on tournaments of the ITF Circuit.

Minella was coached by Norbert Palmier from May 2008 until 2011. She is coached by Tim Sommer, her husband since October 2014.

Tennis career

Early years: 2000–2005
In 2000, Minella debuted for the Luxembourg Fed Cup team, partnering Celine Francois in the doubles matches against the teams of Ukraine and Great Britain, losing both times. After again participating in Fed Cup in 2001 (where she won her first rubber), she began competing on the ITF Women's Circuit in the same year. In 2002, she received a qualifying wildcard into the WTA Tour Tier III Luxembourg Open, losing the first round. She reached her first ITF singles final in 2003, losing to Liana-Gabriela Balaci in three sets.

She lost again in ITF finals in 2004 (in both singles and doubles at the same tournament in Napoli), before winning her first singles title in Zadar later that year. in 2005, she won her second title, in Gardone Val Trompia.

ITF tennis
In 2006, she won an ITF tournament in Caserta, as well as being a finalist a week later (both matches versus Alisa Kleybanova). In 2009, three years later, she won her fourth ITF title, in Tessenderlo, Belgium.

2010: US Open third round
In 2010, Minella had more success on the ITF Circuit, winning two $25k events, in Lutz, Florida and in Stuttgart-Vaihingen, and finishing runner-up in Laguna Niguel, California.

In the qualifying draw for the US Open, Minella won all three matches and lost just one set. In her first appearance in the main draw of a Grand Slam tournament, she beat world No. 47, Polona Hercog to advance to the second round. She continued her good performance by defeating world No. 34 and Wimbledon semifinalist, Tsvetana Pironkova. In the third round, however, she lost to world No. 4, Venus Williams.

2012: Another third round appearance at US Open

In 2012, Minella played her first Australian Open main draw. She was given direct entry, being ranked No. 110. She lost to American qualifier Jamie Hampton in the first round. She then went on to reach the final of a $100k tournament in Cali. Despite defeating top-seed Marina Erakovic along the way, she lost the final to second seed Alexandra Dulgheru. She fared better in doubles, winning the title with Karin Knapp. As a result of her performances, Minella broke into the top-100 singles rankings for the first time. She then played at the Copa Colsanitas, losing in the first round. She reached the final in doubles; her first WTA final of any kind. At the Monterrey Open, she faced Frenchwoman Mathilde Johansson and won in three sets. She followed this up with a win over wildcard Yaroslava Shvedova in a tight three-setter. Minella lost to second seed Sara Errani in her first WTA singles quarterfinal. At the Nürnberger Gastein tournament, Minella defeated Johanna Larsson to reach her first WTA Tour semifinal (against Yanina Wickmayer). She reached the third round of Wimbledon doubles alongside Olga Govortsova, losing to Llagostera Vives and Martínez Sánchez.

2013: A pair of WTA doubles titles

In 2013, Minella started her season at the Shenzhen Open, where she faced first seed Li Na but lost in straight sets. She then played the Hobart International where she qualified for the main draw but lost to Monica Niculescu in the first round. In the doubles event she partnered Tímea Babos and went on to reach the final, after the pair saved multiple match points in their first-round match. They eventually lost to Garbiñe Muguruza and María Teresa Torró Flor in the final. Minella then continued her disappointing run of first-round losses where she lost to Valeria Savinykh in the first round of the Australian Open. She partnered Megan Moulton-Levy in the doubles event and also saved multiple match points in their first-round match, eventually going on to win. The pair then lost, however, in the second round. Minella then played the Paris indoor but suffered a first-round loss in qualifying and another first-round loss in doubles. She then went to play in the Copa Colsanitas where she had more positive results, reaching the quarterfinals in singles, beating Tatjana Malek and Tímea Babos before losing to Teliana Pereira. In the doubles event, Minella again partnered Babos, going on to win her first WTA Tour title. The pair did not drop a set all week.

Minella went on to play the Mexican Open but lost to Silvia Soler Espinosa in the first round. She then lost out to Olga Govortsova at Indian Wells in a tight three-setter. At Miami, Minella fell in qualifying to junior player Kateřina Siniaková. In the doubles event, she played with Babos once more, with the pair putting up a fight against the top seeds Sara Errani and Roberta Vinci, in the second round, but it wasn't enough to advance. Minella then suffered another first-round loss at Charleston, to Camila Giorgi. At the Katowice Open, she defeated Vesna Dolonc in the first round before falling to the first seed Petra Kvitová. Minella then went on to play the Marrakech Grand Prix and defeated Estrella Cabeza Candela in the first round, fourth seed Kaia Kanepi in the second, and Soler Espinosa in the quarterfinals. She lost her semifinal match to Lourdes Domínguez Lino but won the doubles event with Tímea Babos.

Continuing her season playing an ITF tournament in France, Minella lost to Cabeza Candela in the quarterfinals. She played the French Open, suffering first-round losses in singles, doubles and mixed doubles. Minella then had a string of first-round losses, including at the Wimbledon Championships to the world No. 1, Serena Williams. At the US Open, she lost to Sloane Stephens in the final set tiebreak, having been up a break in the third set.

Due to not being able to defend her third round points from the 2012 US Open, Minella's rank dropped to 132. Her next tournament would be the Tashkent Open, where she reached the semifinals in singles and was runner-up, partnering Govortsova, in doubles.

Minella then suffered early losses in multiple tournaments including losses to Estrella Cabeza Candela, Casey Dellacqua, Belinda Bencic and Caroline Wozniacki. She then went on to play at the ITF Poitiers where she defeated Donna Vekić in the first round, only to lose to eventual tournament champion, Aliaksandra Sasnovich, in the second.

Minella's last two tournaments were to be in North America. She played the Tevlin Women's Challenger defeating Élisabeth Fournier and Julia Boserup easily before falling to eventual champion, Victoria Duval, in the quarterfinals. She then went to her last tournament of the year at the South Seas Island Resort Women's Pro Classic, defeating Hsu Chieh-yu, Allie Will, Boserup and Allie Kiick to reach the final in which she played Gabriela Dabrowski, defeating her in straight sets.

In 2013, Minella won three matches 6–0, 6–0; against Kamilla Farhad, Julia Boserup and Allie Kiick.

2014: Injuries and inconsistency
In 2014, Minella started the year at the Brisbane International where she lost to Heather Watson in the first round of qualifying, but reached the semifinals in the doubles event partnering Chanelle Scheepers. Then, at the Sydney International, Minella suffered a second successive qualifying loss at the first qualifying stage, this time at the hands of Ukrainian Lesia Tsurenko.

Minella scored her first win of the season at the Australian Open where she defeated German qualifier Carina Witthöft in straight sets, scoring her first win at a Grand Slam championship outside of the US Open, but her run was not to go further as she fell in the second round to 29th seed Anastasia Pavlyuchenkova.

Minella then was forced to withdraw from the events in Paris, Rio and Acapulco, as well as the Fed Cup due to an edema in her right arm, in which she had experienced pain whilst playing in Australia. She made her comeback at the Indian Wells Open, losing to Allie Klick in the first round of qualifying. She lost again at the first qualifying stage a fortnight later in Miami.

Minella had to take a couple of weeks off again due to the edema and hoped to be back in Marrakech for the Morocco Open, but sat out a further week before playing at the $25k Wiesbaden Open in Germany, losing in the first round of singles, but making the final in doubles with Julia Glushko. The pair lost in straight sets to Viktorija Golubic and Diāna Marcinkēviča.

Minella encountered further first-round losses at Cagnes-sur-Mer, Prague, the French Open and Marseille. She then won the $25k in Essen (Bredeney) defeating Richèl Hogenkamp in the final. Although the success on clay did not translate to success on grass as she encountered another first-round loss in qualifying at Wimbledon to Shelby Rogers. Minella then went on to have success on the ITF Circuit reaching the semifinals of a $25k event in Stuttgart, reaching the quarterfinals at the Lorraine Open 88 and the semifinals at Biarritz.

But the success did not translate towards the WTA Tour, suffering first-round losses at the İstanbul Cup and the Jiangxi International Open. Minella then went to play the US Open suffering a first-round loss to Kateryna Kozlova in the first qualifying round. She had scheduled to play doubles at the US Open with Camila Giorgi, but later withdrew.

Minella started her Asian tour at the Tashkent Open where she was defending semifinal points but she failed to do so, losing in the first round to Donna Vekić. The next stop was at Seoul where she qualified for the main draw, defeating Choi Ji-hee, Hong Seung-yeon and Hsu Chieh-yu, all in straight sets. In the main draw, she drew Belgian Yanina Wickmayer, but lost. In the doubles event, partnering with German Mona Barthel, she reached the final losing to Lara Arruabarrena and Irina-Camelia Begu.

Minella then continued to lose in qualifying rounds in Beijing and Linz, but also continued her success with Barthel in the doubles competitions in Wuhan, Beijing and Linz winning a round in each. Her year ended in her home tournament in Luxembourg where she faced Barthel in the first round and lost in straight sets. Minella stated that her edema in the right arm obtained in January had still been hurting her, finishing the year in October.

2015: Continued inconsistency
In 2015, Minella went to Melbourne in mid-December to prepare early for the season. She started in Auckland where she won two matches in qualifying over Barbora Krejčíková and Sharon Fichman, before falling at the last hurdle to Anna Tatishvili. She also had no luck in the doubles event with Barthel, losing in the first round. Minella then headed to the Australian Open, but lost in the first qualifying round to Paula Ormaechea. She fared better in the doubles event with Barthel, they reached the second round. Minella then went on to reach the quarterfinals at the Burnie International, falling to eventual champion Daria Gavrilova. In her next tournaments, she suffered early losses in qualifying of WTA events and in main draws of ITF events.

At the Bolívar Open, Minella won the doubles title partnering Lourdes Domínguez Lino, defeating Mariana Duque and Julia Glushko in the final. She qualified for the Colombia Open where she defeated Patricia Mayr-Achleitner in the first round before losing to Teliana Pereira. She continued her poor form in singles where she had a string of early losses in WTA and ITF draws as well as the mistake of forgetting to enter the French Open singles qualifying tournament. She, however, contested the doubles competition of the French Open, partnering Barthel, but they lost in the first round. At Wimbledon, Minella won her first career matches on grass, reaching the final qualifying round, defeating Amanda Carreras and Lourdes Domínguez Lino before losing to Laura Siegemund. Partnering Magda Linette, Minella qualified for the doubles competition, however the pair lost to Tímea Babos and Kristina Mladenovic in the first round. The poor form in Minella's 2015 season did continue, losing in the second round of the Lorraine Open 88, the first round of the Swedish Open and the Brasil Tennis Cup and in qualifying stages of the Vancouver Open.

It was the latter part of the year when Minella began to turn around, qualifying for the Tournoi de Québec, reaching the doubles final of the Internacional Femenil Monterrey and the quarterfinals of the Red Rock Pro Open. It was not until the Kirkland Challenger where Minella gained her confidence. She won the singles and doubles title of the Challenger, defeating players such as Sofia Arvidsson, Jovana Jakšić, Antonia Lottner, Jessica Pegula and Nicole Gibbs. In her second-round match against Jakšić, Minella was down 4–6, 0–5, and won the match 4–6, 7–5, 6–3, saving three match points. This was her second $50k title, her biggest to date. Next tournament was the Luxembourg Open where she received a main-draw wildcard into the singles event, however, she had no luck in her draw once again, losing to former world No. 1, Jelena Janković, in the first round. She had more success in the doubles competition, where she partnered Julie Coin, reaching the quarterfinals. Her last tournament of the season was to be the Open de Limoges. Despite losing in qualifying to Anna Blinkova, Minella entered into the main draw as lucky loser following Lesia Tsurenko's withdrawal. In the first round, she managed to defeat Stefanie Vögele. However, she then fell to former Roland Garros champion, Francesca Schiavone, in straight sets. But Minella finished season on a high, after winning the doubles competition, partnering Barbora Krejčíková. This marked her first triumph at a WTA 125 tournament.

2016
In 2016, Minella started the year poorly, including a string of first-round losses in Auckland, Melbourne and Launceston. At the Taiwan Open in Kaohsiung, she managed to score another WTA main-draw win, defeating Naomi Osaka in the first round before falling to local favourite Hsieh Su-wei. However, Minella bowed out in the first or second round of her next four events which included both ITF and WTA tournaments. In Fed Cup, she began to turn the tide, boasting an unbeaten record in Europe/Africa Zone Group III, helping Luxembourg gain promotion to Group II in 2017 alongside teammates Claudine Schaul, Eléonora Molinaro and Merima Mujasevic.

Minella began her 2016 clay-court campaign at the Prague Open. However, she lost to Océane Dodin in the second qualifying round. A few more early losses in Cagnes-sur-Mer, Saint-Gaudens and Strasbourg had only given more worries as she had failed to win back-to-back singles matches, excluding Fed Cup, for the entire year. This was not to change at the French Open though, as she lost to Klára Koukalová in the second round of qualifying. The Bol Open, however, proved to be a lucky charm for Minella as she started to turn her year around. This event saw her win her first WTA singles title in which she boasted wins over current top and former top-100 players Evgeniya Rodina, Varvara Lepchenko, Marina Erakovic, Ana Konjuh and Polona Hercog.

Personal life
Minella was born in Esch-sur-Alzette to parents Mario and Anna Minella and started playing tennis at the age of five.

On 17 October 2014, Minella married her coach and boyfriend Tim Sommer in her home town of Esch-sur-Alzette. In October 2017, she gave birth to a daughter, Emma Lina.
On 12 December 2020, she gave birth to her second child, girl Maya.

Grand Slam performance timelines

Singles

Doubles

WTA career finals

Singles: 1 (runner-up)

Doubles: 7 (2 titles, 5 runner–ups)

WTA 125 tournament finals

Singles: 1 (title)

Doubles: 3 (3 titles)

ITF Circuit finals

Singles: 24 (16 titles, 8 runner–ups)

Doubles: 18 (10 titles, 8 runner–ups)

Head-to-head record vs. top 20
Players who have been ranked world No. 1 are in boldface. Players who have been ranked in the top 10 are in italics
  Victoria Azarenka (0–1)
  Elena Bovina (0–1)
  Alizé Cornet (0–1)
  Eleni Daniilidou (0–2)
  Kimiko Date-Krumm (2–0)
  Sara Errani (0–3)
  Kirsten Flipkens (0–1)
  Julia Görges (0–3)
  Anna-Lena Grönefeld (0–1)
  Jelena Jankovic (0–1)
  Kaia Kanepi (1–1)
  Alisa Kleybanova (1–1)
  Petra Kvitová (0–2)
  Li Na (0–2)
  Sabine Lisicki (1–0)
  Anabel Medina Garrigues (0–1)
  Garbiñe Muguruza (1–0)
  Anastasia Pavlyuchenkova (0–1)
  Karolína Plíšková (2–2)
  Virginie Razzano (1–1)
  Aravane Rezaï (1–1)
  Lucie Šafářová (0–2)
  Francesca Schiavone (0–1)
  Sloane Stephens (0–1)
  Barbora Strýcová (0–1)
  Carla Suárez Navarro (1–1)
  Tamarine Tanasugarn (1–1)
  Roberta Vinci'' (0–1)
  Serena Williams (0–1)
  Venus Williams (0–1)
  Caroline Wozniacki (0–1)

Notes

References

External links

 
 
 

1985 births
Living people
Sportspeople from Esch-sur-Alzette
Luxembourgian female tennis players
Luxembourgian people of Italian descent